As of November 2010, there were 59 locally listed buildings in Crawley, a town and borough in the county of West Sussex in southeast England.  One of these has subsequently been demolished.  A locally listed building is defined as "a building, structure or feature that, whilst not statutorily listed by the Secretary of State, the Council considers to be an important part of Crawley's heritage due to its architectural, historic or archaeological significance".  Crawley Borough Council administers the selection and deselection process, defines the criteria for inclusion, and produces and updates the local list.

Crawley is a postwar New Town with a population was 106,597 at the time of the United Kingdom Census 2011, but many older buildings remain.  The area covered by the present borough consisted of the small market town of Crawley itself, several villages such as Ifield and Worth, country estates with large houses, extensive grounds and lodges, and some Victorian and Edwardian suburban development.  Buildings of various types from these eras are represented on the local list, as are New Town-era features—from churches to shopping parades.

Some buildings lie within conservation areas, of which Crawley has eleven.  Others have been suggested as candidates for statutory listing, which would recognise them as buildings of national importance.  Previous versions of the local list have included buildings which have been removed because they were upgraded to nationally listed status, others whose quality had been degraded so that they no longer met the council's criteria, and others lost to demolition and redevelopment.

Criteria

Crawley Borough Council uses five criteria in choosing which buildings and structures should be designated.  Historic interest refers to how well the building exemplifies the era in which it was built, particularly if it represents "an important phase in Crawley’s history".  Architectural interest is judged on factors such as the notability (locally or more generally) of people and companies involved in the design and construction, and the style of the building—especially if it uses locally produced materials or is "a good example of the local vernacular".  Group or townscape value applies to buildings with significance in the street scene or aesthetically pleasing settings, and to those considered local landmarks (such as St Alban's Church at Gossops Green, which stands in the centre of the neighbourhood overlooking green space and which has a prominent campanile).  Intactness has two elements as a criterion.  Locally listed buildings should retain "a high proportion of [their] historic features", ideally with little or no alterations.  However, buildings which would usually be of high enough quality to be included on the national list had they not been altered can be also added to the local list. Communal value ("the extent to which a building or structure is valued by the local community") applies to buildings such as public and civic buildings, places of worship and structures with symbolic significance.  All buildings on the list as of November 2010 were described by the council as "strongly fulfil[ling]" the historic interest criterion; and all except 31–33 High Street also meet the architectural interest criterion.  The other three criteria are met to varying degrees, either "strongly" or "slightly".

A study was undertaken in April 2010 to update Crawley's local list; the November 2010 update was issued as a result of this.  Of the 59 buildings on the list, 13 were added at that time: 49 Brighton Road, Crawley United Reformed Church, Deerswood Court, the former Embassy cinema (latterly Bar Med), 11 Horsham Road, Oak House, the Old Post Office and Malvern Cottage, Poplars, 1 Pullcotts Farm Cottages, St Alban's Church, St Edward the Confessor's Church, St Mary's Church and The Oaks Primary School. A recommendation was also made to add Toovies Farmhouse on Balcombe Road in Tinsley Green to the local list, but it already appears on the national statutory list as a Grade II listed building.  At the same time, 11 buildings were removed from the local list.  The Beehive at Gatwick Airport and the former stable block at Milton Mount Gardens had been upgraded to nationally listed buildings, and 52 High Street had been incorporated into the national listing for the George Hotel.  A gun tower at Forge Farm and the former Baptist chapel at Robinson Road had been demolished.  Elsewhere, Westview Cottages and Holly Cottage in Fernhill were removed because their "historic character [had] been eroded" by alterations such as exterior painting and replacement of original windows; the four-building terrace at 53–59 High Street was removed because of significant alteration, especially at ground-floor level; 45 High Street was removed because windows and its shopfront had been replaced, affecting its architectural importance; 13–15 New Street in Three Bridges were removed because a series of alterations and modernisations had "damaged the historic character of these buildings"; and Toovies Farm Cottage and Norfolk Cottage were removed because extensions and replacement windows reduced their historical significance.  Since the list was released in November 2010, the former Embassy cinema in the town centre (opened on 1 August 1938) was demolished following the submission of a planning application for redevelopment of the site in August 2011.  In its final incarnation as the Bar Med nightclub, it closed on 28 August 2012.

Crawley borough has eight conservation areas—"areas of special architectural or historic interest, the character or appearance of which it is desirable to preserve or enhance".  The Dyers Almshouses are part of the conservation area of the same name; Ifield Barn Theatre is in the Ifield conservation area; and Nightingale House is within the Brighton Road conservation area.  The St Peter's conservation area includes the Swan Inn and St Peter's Church.  The High Street conservation area has several locally listed buildings: Grand Parade, 1–4 Ifield Road and the buildings at numbers 31–33, 37, 41–43 and 47 High Street.

History and context

Crawley has ancient origins, as do the surrounding villages which became part of the present urban area.  Growth was slow for centuries, though, and the character of a small market town was maintained.  Rural but within easy reach of London, and with a reputation for healthy air and a wide variety of leisure pursuits, the area became popular in the 19th century among wealthy people wishing to establish country residences.  Many large houses were built, often in extensive grounds and with ancillary buildings as part of the estate.  Most have been demolished or converted to alternative uses.  Surviving examples include the Gothic Revival Gatwick House (1876) at Fernhill, now offices; the mid-19th-century Burstow Hall nearby, which is still residential; and Goffs Park House (1882), whose vast grounds have become a public park.  Tilgate House and Worth Park (later Milton Mount College) were demolished in the 1950s and 1960s respectively, but their lodges survive (both in commercial use), as do others on the Turners Hill Road and at Povey Cross (still residential).

The 19th century was also characterised by haphazard and small-scale residential development in areas such as West Green, Southgate and Ifield, stimulated by Crawley's increasing commercial importance and the coming of the railway.  Many cottages and villas survive from that era, and better examples have been given locally listed status.  Weatherboarding (as at 6–8 Crawley Lane and Woodcote Cottage in Pound Hill, and The Open Door at Tinsley Green), tile-hung upper storeys (as at Rose Cottage, 89 and 91 Three Bridges Road and some of the Victorian pubs) and large gable ends are common features.  The High Street became more formalised as a commercial area at this time, and several buildings on both sides are locally listed.

Crawley was designated a New Town in January 1947, and the Crawley Development Corporation was set up to acquire land, raise finance and provide all the buildings and services required to meet the aims of planning consultant Anthony Minoprio's masterplan—the most important of which was to reach a target population of 50,000 by 1962.  Self-contained residential areas ("neighbourhoods") were laid out around the existing town centre, which was greatly extended.  The ancient village of Ifield, the mostly Victorian development of Three Bridges (centred on a pre-railway era hamlet with a pub and village green) and other nearby settlements were all joined up.  Each neighbourhood had standard features at its centre: one or more churches, a community centre, a shopping parade, a pub and, in some cases, schools.  Some of the better-quality buildings have been awarded locally listed status. The Anglican churches in the Southgate and Gossops Green neighbourhoods (built in 1958 and 1962 respectively), Pound Hill's Roman Catholic church of 1965, with its "striking" triangular design, and the nearby United Reformed Church building (erected in 1955–57 for Congregationalists), are all on the list.  So are the shopping arcades at Gossops Green and Tilgate: the former, described as "excellent" by Nikolaus Pevsner, dates from the mid-1960s, while Tilgate's is from the previous decade.  The "impressive" structure was on one occasion visited by a delegation of civic dignitaries from Yugoslavia, who travelled to Crawley to inspect its architecture: such visits were common in the early New Town era (for example, more than 2,000 official visitors from 48 countries came in 1958). A 1950s primary school in Tilgate, with a distinctive tower which is believed to hide the chimney of an incinerator, also features on the list.  There were few flats anywhere in the New Town, as incoming residents preferred houses, but the Deerswood Court development (which preserved the grounds of the old mansion whose site it occupied) won a Civic Trust Award and has been locally listed.

Crawley has 13 New Town neighbourhoods.  Most are coterminous with an electoral ward of the same name, which are the geographical divisions used on the local list.  The Pound Hill North ward, which covers the northeastern part of the borough up to the county boundary with Surrey, includes the rural hamlets of Tinsley Green and Fernhill, both of which have several locally listed buildings.  They are therefore listed as part of Pound Hill North.  Crawley's boundaries were extended several times in the New Town era—the area defined by the masterplan had included parts of eight local government areas and three counties—and when the borough was formed in 1974, most of the remaining parts of Surrey within the urban area became part of the borough.  The rest of Fernhill, which was split between West Sussex and Surrey, was added to the borough in 1990.

Locally listed buildings

See also

Listed buildings in Crawley
List of conservation areas in Crawley

References

Notes

Bibliography

Buildings and structures in Crawley
Lists of listed buildings in West Sussex